In mathematics, the Birman–Murakami–Wenzl (BMW) algebra, introduced by  and , is a two-parameter family of algebras  of dimension  having the Hecke algebra of the symmetric group as a quotient.  It is related to the Kauffman polynomial of a link. It is a deformation of  the Brauer algebra in much the same way that Hecke algebras are deformations of the group algebra of the symmetric group.

Definition

         

       

       

      

These relations imply the further relations: 
 
  

This is the original definition given by Birman and Wenzl. However a slight change by the introduction of some minus signs is  sometimes made, in accordance with Kauffman's 'Dubrovnik' version of his link invariant. In that way, the fourth relation in Birman & Wenzl's original version is changed to 
 (Kauffman skein relation) 

Given invertibility of m, the rest of the relations in Birman & Wenzl's original version can be reduced to 
  (Idempotent relation) 

 (Braid relations) 

 (Tangle relations) 

 (Delooping relations)

Properties
The Iwahori–Hecke algebra associated with the symmetric group  is a quotient of the Birman–Murakami–Wenzl algebra .
The Artin braid group embeds in the BMW algebra, .

Isomorphism between the BMW algebras and Kauffman's tangle algebras
It is proved by  that the BMW algebra  is isomorphic to the Kauffman's tangle algebra , the isomorphism  is defined by 
 and

Baxterisation of Birman–Murakami–Wenzl algebra
Define the face operator as
,
 
and 
. 

Then the face operator satisfies the Yang–Baxter equation. 
 
Now  with 
. 
In the limits , the braids  can be recovered up to a scale factor.

History
In 1984, Vaughan Jones introduced a new polynomial invariant of link isotopy types which is called the Jones polynomial. The invariants are related to the traces of irreducible representations of Hecke algebras associated with the symmetric groups.  showed that the Kauffman polynomial can also be interpreted as a function  on a certain associative algebra. In 1989,  constructed a two-parameter family of algebras   with the Kauffman polynomial   as trace after appropriate renormalization.

References

Representation theory
Knot theory
Diagram algebras